The Birmingham metropolitan area, sometimes known as Greater Birmingham, is a metropolitan area in north central Alabama centered on Birmingham, Alabama.

, the federal government defines the Birmingham–Hoover, AL Metropolitan Statistical Area as consisting of six counties (Bibb, Blount, Chilton, Jefferson, St. Clair, and Shelby) centered on Birmingham. The population of this metropolitan statistical area as of the 2020 census was 1,115,289, making it the 50th largest metropolitan statistical area in the United States as of that date. 

The six counties in the Birmingham–Hoover metropolitan statistical area are combined with the Cullman micropolitan area (Cullman County) and the Talladega–Sylacauga Micropolitan Statistical Area (Talladega County and Coosa County) to form the federally defined Birmingham–Hoover–Talladega, AL Combined Statistical Area.

According to the United States Census 2020 census, the combined statistical area has a population of 1,350,646. It is the 42nd largest population sub-region in the United States, and the largest population region in Alabama, constituting roughly 1/4 of the state's population. It is the largest population region in Central Alabama. The northern counties of the Birmingham metro area specifically Blount and Cullman are also part of the North Alabama region also known locally as the Tennessee Valley and are overlapped by the much larger Birmingham metropolitan area despite its proximity to the nearby Huntsville metro. Nearby counties Tuscaloosa, Etowah, and Calhoun, while not officially a part of Greater Birmingham, contribute significantly to the region's economy. The Birmingham media market covers these counties as well. According to the List of metropolitan areas of Alabama,  
Birmingham is the largest urban area and metro in Alabama. Birmingham is part of the Piedmont Atlantic Megaregion containing an estimated 19 million people, while many residents also consider themselves part of the Deep South. It is classified as Southeast by the U.S. Census and also falls in the geographic area of the Upland South due to its location at the southern terminus of the Appalachian foothills. The entire MSA and CSA are within the congressional Appalachian Regional Commission's definition of Appalachia.

Counties 
 Chilton
 Jefferson
 St. Clair
 Shelby
 Bibb
 Blount
 Cullman*
 Coosa*
 Talladega*

Counties marked with * are officially part of the Birmingham–Hoover–Talladega, AL Combined Statistical Area

Cities

Anchor city
 Birmingham

Principal cities
 Hoover
Cullman*

Suburbs with more than 10,000 inhabitants
 Alabaster
 Bessemer
 Calera
 Center Point
 Chelsea
 Fairfield
 Forestdale
 Gardendale
 Homewood
 Helena
 Hueytown
 Irondale
 Jasper
 Leeds
 Mountain Brook
 Moody
 Pelham
 Pell City
 Pleasant Grove
 Sylacauga*
 Talladega*
 Trussville
 Vestavia Hills

Demographics
According to the 2019 ACS 1-Year Estimates Data Profiles, there were 1,090,435 people living in the Birmingham–Hoover, AL Metropolitan Area. The racial makeup of the area was 65.8% White, 31.6% African American, 1.9% Asian, 0.9% Native American, 0.1% Pacific Islander, 1.6% from other races, and 1.6% from two or more races. 4.5% of the population were Hispanic of any race.

Economy 
The economy of Greater Birmingham is the most diversified of any metropolitan area in Alabama. Many of the region's major employers are located in Birmingham and Jefferson County. The economy of Birmingham ranges from service industries such as banking and finance to health-related technological research and heavy industry. The University of Alabama at Birmingham (UAB) is Alabama's largest employer as well as the area's largest, with some 20,000 employees. The area is world headquarters for Regions Financial, and Books-A-Million, the second largest book retailer in the United States.

Major employers 
 Alabama Power
 American Family Care
 Amazon
 AT&T
 Blue Cross and Blue Shield Association of Alabama
 Books-A-Million
 Drummond Company
 EBSCO Industries
 Encompass Health
 Hibbett Sports, Inc.
 Liberty National Life Insurance Co. (part of Torchmark)
 McWane, Inc.
 Motion Industries
 PNC Financial Services
 Regions Financial Corporation 
 Royal Cup Coffee, Inc.
 Shipt
 Sloss Industries
 Southern Research Institute
 Spire Inc
 Torchmark
 University of Alabama at Birmingham
 Vulcan Materials Company
 Wells Fargo

Retail 
Birmingham is known as the shopping destination in the state of Alabama and a primary shopping hub of the Piedmont Atlantic Megaregion. It includes the major retail destination for the region, the Riverchase Galleria mall, along with several other shopping centers and malls.

Major Malls & Shopping Centers 
 Riverchase Galleria, a 1,570,000 square foot, enclosed-mall in the southern suburb of Hoover. Anchors include Macy's, J. C. Penney, Belk, Von Maur, H&M, Forever 21, and Dave & Busters
 Brookwood Village, an 816,000-square-foot, enclosed mall in the suburbs of Homewood and Mountain Brook. It is anchored by Macy's and Target and also includes a 42,000-square-foot grocery-anchored retail component.
 The Summit, a large, upscale lifestyle center near the Cahaba Heights neighborhood. The center contains Saks Fifth Avenue, Louis Vuitton, Belk, Barnes & Noble, Apple Store, Brooks Brothers, and local department store, Gus Mayer.
 Pinnacle at Tutwiler Farm, a lifestyle center in the eastern suburb of Trussville that is anchored by Belk, Best Buy, and J. C. Penney.
 The Shops At Grand River, an outlet mall in the eastern suburb of Leeds. Anchors include H&M and Old Navy. The development also contains a to-be-constructed residential area, Barber Motorsports Park, and a Bass Pro Shops.

Transportation

Road 
Greater Birmingham is at the convergence of four major interstate highways: Interstate 65 (which connects with Mobile and Chicago); Interstate 20 (which connects with Dallas and Atlanta); Interstate 59 (which connects with New Orleans and Chattanooga); and Interstate 22 (which connects with Memphis). Interstate 459, completed in 1984, forms a southern bypass around Birmingham. It runs through portions of Bessemer, Vestavia Hills, and Trussville, and forms a main route through the primary city of Hoover. Interstate 422, the Birmingham Northern Bypass is planned to run from the current I-20/59/459 interchange near Bessemer to Interstate 59 and US Route 11 near Argo. It is planned to be completed by 2048.

Four U.S. highways, US-31, US-11, US-78, and US-280, run through Greater Birmingham. US-31 parallels Interstate 65 for its entire route, including Greater Birmingham. US-280 runs southeast of the city, connecting it with Auburn and Auburn University. The corridor through suburban Birmingham is notorious for its severe congestion as it carries about 200% of its traffic capacity. US-31 and 280 merge in Homewood to form the Elton B. Stephens Expressway known locally as the Red Mountain Expressway. This expressway goes through a geologic cut through Red Mountain, connecting downtown Birmingham to its southern suburbs. US-78 parallels Interstate 22 to the northwest of Birmingham, and Interstate 20 to the east. US-11 parallels Interstate 59 for its entire route. All four of these highways meet in downtown Birmingham.

Major highways

 Interstate 20
 Interstate 22
 Interstate 59
 Interstate 459
 Interstate 65
 U.S. Highway 11
 U.S. Highway 31
 U.S. Highway 67
 U.S. Highway 231
 U.S. Highway 280
 U.S. Highway 411

Mass transit 
Birmingham received $87 million from the US Congress to help fund a regional transportation system. The city's new $30 million, three-block intermodal station brings Amtrak, Greyhound, the Birmingham-Jefferson County Transit Authority and automotive transportation together in one place.

Air 
Greater Birmingham is served by Birmingham-Shuttlesworth International Airport with American Airlines, American Eagle, Southwest, United, and Delta providing service to more than 40 cities. Established in 1931, BHM has been governed by the Birmingham Airport Authority since its establishment in 1986. In 2008, the airport was renamed Birmingham-Shuttlesworth International Airport in honor of late Birmingham civil rights activist Rev. Fred Shuttlesworth.

Education

Major Colleges & Universities 
 University of Alabama at Birmingham
 Birmingham–Southern College
 Miles College
 University of Montevallo
 Samford University
 Lawson State Community College
 Jefferson State Community College

Natural features 
 Red Mountain
 Oak Mountain State Park
 Double Oak Mountain
 Ruffner Mountain
 Black Warrior River
 Cahaba River
 Cahaba River National Wildlife Refuge
 Talladega National Forest (Oakmulgee Division)
 Coosa River

Rivers 
 Cahaba River
 Black Warrior River
 Coosa River
 Locust Fork of the Black Warrior River
 Mulberry Fork of the Black Warrior River
 Sipsey Fork of the Black Warrior River

See also 

 Piedmont Atlantic
 Table of United States Combined Statistical Areas
 Table of United States Metropolitan Statistical Areas

References

External links 
 Birmingham Business Alliance, a co-operative that involves many of the counties in Greater Birmingham

 
Geography of Birmingham, Alabama
Metropolitan areas of Alabama